Pictures Please is a Canadian children's television series which aired on CBC Television in 1956.

Premise
This series for children was produced in Ottawa by Fred Rainsberry.

Fire safety was the subject of the second episode (16 July 1956), featuring guest Maynard Dolman, chief of Ottawa's Fire Department. Comic illustrations were used to demonstrate the topic.

Scheduling
Pictures Please aired for 15 minutes each Monday at 5:45 p.m. from 9 July to 24 September 1956.

References

External links
 

CBC Television original programming
1956 Canadian television series debuts
1956 Canadian television series endings
1950s Canadian children's television series
Black-and-white Canadian television shows
Television shows filmed in Ottawa